Pseudomonas umsongensis is a Gram-negative, non-spore-forming, motile, single polar-flagellated, yellow-white, rod-shaped bacterium isolated from the soil in the Umsong region of Korea. The type strain is LMG 21317.

References

External links
Type strain of Pseudomonas umsongensis at BacDive -  the Bacterial Diversity Metadatabase

Pseudomonadales
Bacteria described in 2003